Butterfly Kisses is a 2017 British-Polish drama directed by Rafael Kapelinski and written by Greer Ellison. It stars Theo Stevenson, Thomas Turgoose and Rosie Day.

Plot 
We follow Jake and his two best friends through a world distorted by sex and porn. They all have their own demons, but Jake's secret is one that he can't tell anyone.

Cast 
Theo Stevenson as Jake
Thomas Turgoose as Shrek
Elliot Cowan as Billy
Rosie Day as Zara
Charlotte Beaumont as Amy
Honor Kneafsey as Lilly

Reception

The film has received favorable reviews.

References

External links 
 

2017 films
British drama films
2010s English-language films
2010s British films